The Men's foil event of the 2013 World Fencing Championships was held on August 9, 2013. The qualification was held on August 6, 2013.

Medalists

Draw

Finals

Top half

Section 1

Section 2

Bottom half

Section 3

Section 4

Final classification

References

 Official site 
 Bracket from Round of 64 to Round of 16 
 Bracket from Quarterfinals 
 Final Classification 

2013 World Fencing Championships